Kotri river (also known as Paralkot river) is a tributary of Indravati River that flows through Chhattisgarh and Gadchiroli district of Maharashtra.

The river rises in the western hills of Bastar and flows south till it meets Indravati near Bhamragad.

References 

Rivers of Maharashtra
Gadchiroli district
Rivers of India